A slam dunk is a type of basketball shot, in which a player thrusts the ball forcefully down through the basket.
Slam dunk may also refer to:

Arts, entertainment, and media

Music
 "Slam Dunk", a song by Quiet Riot from their 1999 album Alive and Well
 "Slam Dunk (Da Funk)", a 1997 song by Five
 Slam Dunk Records, a UK record label

Other uses in arts, entertainment, and media
 Slam Dunk (film) or Kung Fu Dunk, a 2008 Chinese film loosely based on the manga
 Slam Dunk (manga), a Japanese manga series by Takehiko Inoue
 Sister's Slam Dunk, a South Korean variety show
 Slamdunk Film Festival, a "counter-festival" in Park City, Utah, held during the Sundance Film Festival 1998-2003

Other uses
 Smash (tennis), or slam dunk
 Slam dunk, slang for a sure thing or Piece of Cake 
 Slam-dunk, in low-dimensional topology, a useful move of the Kirby calculus